Priscilla Opoku-Kwarteng (16 February 1997 – 8 February 2018), known by her stage name Ebony Reigns, was a Ghanaian dancehall/Afrobeats artist known for her hit songs "Poison" and "Kupe". She was discovered by Bullet from Ruff n Smooth.

Early life and education
Ebony Reigns was born Priscilla Opoku-Kwarteng, affably known as Nana Heemaa (Oheema) by her close relatives, in Dansoman, a suburb of Accra. Her parents are Nana Poku Kwarteng and Beatrice Oppong Marthin. She was raised in the urban areas of Accra but hailed from the Brong Ahafo region.

She started her basic education at Seven Great Princess Academy in Dansoman, Accra, followed by a high school education at Methodist Girls High School at Mamfe in the Akuapim North District of the Eastern Region, Ghana, though she did not graduate. She quit high school in pursuit of her music career.

Career
Ebony was discovered by musician and entrepreneur Bullet from Ruff n Smooth and was signed to his Ruff Town record label.

She came out with her first single, "Dancefloor", in December 2015, with a video and audio release. The song became a radio hit, landing her a nomination for the "unsung" category at the 2016 Ghana Music Awards.

In March 2016 Ebony released her major hit single "Kupe". She was signed to Ruff Town Records and Midas Touch Inc.

Death
Ebony Reigns was killed instantly in a traffic collision on 8 February 2018 whilst returning from Sunyani to Accra after a visit to her mother. Her assistant and longtime friend Franklina Yaa Nkansah Kuri and soldier Atsu Vondee were also killed in the fatal accident. The only survivor of the fatal crash was the driver named Phinehas, who resides at Teshie. She died eight days before her 21st birthday.

Her final funeral rites were held at the forecourt of the state house, Accra, and she was buried at Osu cemetery on Saturday, March 24, 2018. In preparation for the funeral, the late Ebony's family received a lot of donations from prominent personalities, government and private institutions. Some of the top donors at the funeral were:

Kasapreko Ghana Limited - Ghc 90,000.00
 Zylofon Media - Ghc 50,000.00
 Nana Addo Dankwa Akuffo Addo - Ghc 50,000.00
 Ministry of Tourism, Culture and Creative Arts - Ghc 20,000.00 
 Ibrahim Mahama - Ghc 20,000.00 
 John Dramani Mahama - Ghc 10,000.00

Controversies surrounding her death
After Reigns died, controversies became rampant and people were divided. There were those that believed that it could have been prevented if roads were properly constructed and adequately lighted. Apparently, the Mankranso road she was traveling on that fateful night was in a very bad state and to some critics, that influenced the accident. Others believe her death is an Act of God and that though it was harsh, it could not have been prevented. Still, others attribute her death to what they consider her racy lifestyle and several pastors came out after her death to say that they had prophesied that Reigns would die if she didn't change her "lifestyle".

Dr. Lawrence Tetteh, a renowned pastor in Ghana, also spoke about how some musicians and businesses were taking advantage of Ebony Reigns' death to make profits. Ghana Textile Printing Limited (GTP), for example, is set to manufacture newly customized cloths with some of Ebony's songs such as 'Aseda' and 'Maame Hw3’ for naming ceremonies and funerals, respectively. He insisted that he spent more money on the funeral than anyone and did not appreciate the fact that some companies were making money from her death. This sparked a lot of controversy because some people believed that his comments were not necessary as a pastor and took to social media to express their views. Ebony's death also raised all forms of prophecies concerning deaths of other artists, a typical example is Shatta Wale, known to be Ghana's number one dancehall artist. A pastor revealed Shatta Wale was going to die before the 25th of December 2018, but added, something can be made to stop it. Fans who believed in Ebony's prophecies wished the dancehall king not to die but the artist posted videos on social media threatening to burn churches if he lives after the said date. As to relate Ebony's death to the prophecies or to consider it a normal accident is unknown, each and everyone has the right to believe in what his/her heart directed him/her.

Aftermath
After Ebony Reigns died, some celebrities in Ghana, Sarkodie and Stonebwoy started road safety campaigns to reduce the number of accidents on the roads. On the exact one year after her death, most Ghanaians showed love and concern for the musical artist by posting condolences and pictures of her on social media. Sarkodie has released a song titled ‘Wake Up Call’ to address some causes of road accidents and what to do to reduce them. The song which features singer Benji urges the government to fix bad roads and also enjoins the police to enforce traffic regulations. The Ministry of Tourism, Culture and Creative Arts will also embark on a road safety awareness campaign to ensure sanity on the roads and save more lives. In remembrance of her and commemoration of the 3rd year of her death, her label released 'John 8:7' which featured current label front runner Wendy Shay.

Awards and nominations

References

External links

1997 births
2018 deaths
Dancehall musicians
Reggae fusion artists
Musicians from Accra
Road incident deaths in Ghana
Ghanaian women singers